The 2015 FIBA COCABA Championship for Women was the regional basketball championship of FIBA Americas for the Central American and Caribbean subzone. First and second national teams qualified to 2016 Centrobasket Women. The tournament was held in the city of Cartago, Costa Rica, from 23 to 27 September 2015.

Participating teams

Preliminary round 
The draw for the 2015 FIBA COCABA Championship for Women was held on August 4, 2015. Seven teams were drawn into one pool with 4 teams and another one with 3 teams.

Group A

Group B

Knockout round

5th−7th places semifinal

Semifinals

5th place match

Third place match

Final

Final ranking

References

FIBA COCABA Championship
2015 in women's basketball
2015–16 in North American basketball
2015 in Costa Rican sport
2015 in Central American sport
International basketball competitions hosted by Costa Rica
Cartago, Costa Rica